Bengen is a German surname. Notable people with the surname include:

 Harold Bengen (1879–1962), German artist and art teacher
 William Bengen (born 1947), American finance writer

See also
 Bergen (name)
 Hengen

German-language surnames